The 2016 WGC-Bridgestone Invitational was a professional golf tournament played June 30 – July 3 on the South Course of Firestone Country Club in Akron, Ohio. It was the 18th WGC-Bridgestone Invitational tournament, and the third of the World Golf Championships events in 2016.	

The event was played more than a month earlier than usual, due to the 2016 Summer Olympics.  It was only sanctioned by the PGA Tour, because it ran opposite the Open de France the European Tour did not co-sanction the tournament this year.

Dustin Johnson won his first WGC-Bridgestone Invitational and third WGC overall.

Venue

Course layout
The South Course was designed by Bert Way and redesigned by Robert Trent Jones in 1960.

Field
The field consisted of players drawn primarily from the Official World Golf Ranking and the winners of the worldwide tournaments with the strongest fields.

1. Playing members of the 2015 United States and International Presidents Cup teams.

Steven Bowditch, Jason Day (2,3,4), Rickie Fowler (2,3,4), Branden Grace (2,3,4), Bill Haas (2,3), J. B. Holmes (2,3), Dustin Johnson (2,3,4), Zach Johnson (2,3), Chris Kirk, Matt Kuchar (2,3), Anirban Lahiri, Danny Lee (2,3), Marc Leishman (2,3,4), Hideki Matsuyama (2,3,4), Phil Mickelson (2,3), Louis Oosthuizen (2,3), Patrick Reed (2,3), Charl Schwartzel (2,3,4), Adam Scott (2,3,4), Jordan Spieth (2,3,4), Jimmy Walker (2,3), Bubba Watson (2,3,4)
Bae Sang-moon was unable to compete due to a military obligation in South Korea.
Thongchai Jaidee (4) opted to compete in the Open de France.

2. The top 50 players from the Official World Golf Ranking as of June 20, 2016.

An Byeong-hun (3), Daniel Berger (3,4), Paul Casey (3), Kevin Chappell (3), Harris English, Jim Furyk (3), Emiliano Grillo (3,4), Charley Hoffman (3,4), Kim Kyung-tae (3), Kevin Kisner (3,4), Søren Kjeldsen (3), Russell Knox (3,4), Brooks Koepka (3), David Lingmerth (3), Shane Lowry (3,4), William McGirt (3,4), Kevin Na (3), Scott Piercy (3), Justin Rose (3,4), Brandt Snedeker (3,4), Justin Thomas (3,4)
Rafa Cabrera-Bello (3), Matt Fitzpatrick (3,4), Rory McIlroy (3,4), Andy Sullivan (3), Lee Westwood (3), Bernd Wiesberger (3), Danny Willett (3,4), and Chris Wood (3,4) opted to compete in the Open de France.
Sergio García (3,4) and Henrik Stenson (3,4) did not play.

3. The top 50 players from the Official World Golf Ranking as of June 27, 2016.

Kiradech Aphibarnrat

4. Tournament winners, whose victories are considered official, of tournaments from the Federation Tours since the prior season's Bridgestone Invitational with an Official World Golf Ranking Strength of Field Rating of 115 points or more.

Jason Dufner, Marcus Fraser, Fabián Gómez, James Hahn, Jim Herman, Billy Hurley III, Andrew Johnston, Matt Jones, Smylie Kaufman, Davis Love III, Song Young-han, Brian Stuard, Vaughn Taylor
Kristoffer Broberg, Victor Dubuisson, and Thorbjørn Olesen opted to compete in the Open de France.

5. The winner of selected tournaments from each of the following tours:
Asian Tour: Thailand Golf Championship (2015) – Jamie Donaldson (opted to compete in the Open de France)
PGA Tour of Australasia: Australian PGA Championship (2015) – Nathan Holman
Japan Golf Tour: Bridgestone Open (2015) – Michio Matsumura
Japan Golf Tour: Japan Golf Tour Championship – Yosuke Tsukada
Sunshine Tour: Dimension Data Pro-Am – George Coetzee

Nationalities in the field

Past champions in the field

Source:

Round summaries

First round
Thursday, June 30, 2016

Source

Second round
Friday, July 1, 2016

Source

Third round
Saturday, July 2, 2016

Source

Final round
Sunday, July 3, 2016

Source

Scorecard
Final round

Cumulative tournament scores, relative to par

Source

References

External links

Firestone Country Club site

WGC Invitational
WGC-Bridgestone Invitational
WGC-Bridgestone Invitational
WGC-Bridgestone Invitational
WGC-Bridgestone Invitational
WGC-Bridgestone Invitational